The 1996 Internationaux de Strasbourg was a women's tennis tournament played on outdoor clay courts in Strasbourg, France that was part of Tier III of the 1996 WTA Tour. It was the tenth edition of the tournament and was held from 20 May until 25 May 1996. Third-seeded Lindsay Davenport won the singles title.

Finals

Singles

 Lindsay Davenport defeated  Barbara Paulus 6–3, 7–6(8–6)
 It was Davenport's 2nd title of the year and the 12th of her career.

Doubles

 Yayuk Basuki /  Nicole Bradtke defeated  Marianne Werdel-Witmeyer /  Tami Whitlinger-Jones 5–7, 6–4, 6–4
 It was Basuki's 2nd title of the year and the 11th of her career. It was Bradtke's only title of the year and the 12th of her career.

References

External links
 ITF tournament edition details 
 Tournament draws

Internationaux de Strasbourg
1996
Internationaux de Strasbourg
Internationaux de Strasbourg